Greg Poss (born August 6, 1965, in Green Bay, Wisconsin) is a former American hockey player and coach. He was most recently the head coach of the EC Red Bull Salzburg of the Austrian Hockey League.

Playing career
Poss began his career with the Dubuque Fighting Saints in the United States Hockey League. He then played four years for the University of Wisconsin men's ice hockey team. In 1989 he made his professional debut in the American Hockey League for the Maine Mariners . After two seasons, he joined the International Hockey League with the Peoria Rivermen. After a serious knee injury he had to finish his playing career.

Coaching career

Germany
Poss' primary experience with head coaching is in the top-tier hockey league of Germany, the Deutsche Eishockey Liga, where he coached the Iserlohn Roosters, the Nürnberg Ice Tigers and Adler Mannheim. From October 2004 to November 2005 he was also head coach of the German national ice hockey team. Poss coached in the DEL through 2008.

United States
Poss served as assistant coach of the Ontario Reign for the 2009–10 ECHL season. He signed a two-year contract with the Florida Everblades starting with the 2010–11 ECHL season. In Florida, Poss continued the Everblades' streak of consecutive post-season appearances until it ended in the 2013–14 season. In the 2011 Kelly Cup playoffs, his Everblades were eliminated in the 1st round by the eventual East Division Champions, the Kalamazoo Wings. In the 2012 Kelly Cup playoffs, he guided the Everblades to their first-ever Kelly Cup, defeating the Ryan Mougenel-led Las Vegas Wranglers 4–1.

On May 26, 2016, Poss left the Everblades for the head coaching position with EC Red Bull Salzburg in the Austrian Hockey League. Poss led the Salzburg team to semifinal appearance in the Champions Hockey League in the 2018–19 season. He parted company with the club in late February 2019.

Statistics

Playing

Coaching

References

External links
 

1965 births
Living people
Sportspeople from Green Bay, Wisconsin
Wisconsin Badgers men's ice hockey players
Ice hockey coaches from Wisconsin
Dubuque Fighting Saints players
Maine Mariners players
Peoria Rivermen (IHL) players
American men's ice hockey forwards
Deutsche Eishockey Liga coaches
ECHL coaches
Ice hockey players from Wisconsin